The West Marion Historic District is a historic district in the city of Marion, Alabama. The historic district is bounded by West Lafayette, Washington, College, Margin streets, and Murfree Avenue. It features examples of Colonial Revival, Craftsman, Greek Revival, and regional vernacular architecture. It spans  and contains 108 contributing properties. One contributing building of special significance is Reverie. The district was placed on the National Register of Historic Places on April 22, 1993.

References

National Register of Historic Places in Perry County, Alabama
Historic districts in Perry County, Alabama
Colonial Revival architecture in Alabama
Greek Revival architecture in Alabama
Historic districts on the National Register of Historic Places in Alabama
Marion, Alabama